Puʻu Hawaiʻiloa is a cinder cone located in Honolulu County, Hawaii on the Mokapu Peninsula.

Much like neighboring Ulupaʻu Crater. it formed as a vent of the Koʻolau Range during the Honolulu Volcanic Series. The material of the cone is nepheline basalt. Puʻu Hawaiʻiloa is used by Marine Corps Base Hawaii and the Wailuku Community Center is next to it.

See also 

 Honolulu Volcanics
 Koʻolau Range
 Ulupaʻu Crater
 Marine Corps Base Hawaii
 Kāneʻohe Bay

References 

Volcanoes of Hawaii
Cinder cones of the United States
Geography of Honolulu County, Hawaii